Gabriella Carrel (born 30 July 1966) is an Italian cross-country skier.

Carrel was born in Aosta. Competing in the 1988 Winter Olympics at Calgary, she finished 42nd in the women's 5 km event.

Cross-country skiing results
All results are sourced from the International Ski Federation (FIS).

Olympic Games

World Championships

World Cup

Season standings

References

External links
 
 

1966 births
Living people
Italian female cross-country skiers
Olympic cross-country skiers of Italy
Cross-country skiers at the 1988 Winter Olympics
People from Aosta
Sportspeople from Aosta Valley